Puerto Rico Highway 179 (PR-179) is a rural road that travels from Guayama to Cayey in Puerto Rico. It goes through Patillas but with no major junctions. This road extends from PR-15 north of downtown Guayama and ends at PR-184 in Farallón.

Major intersections

See also

 List of highways numbered 179

References

External links
 

179